Holtzendorff or von Holtzendorff can refer to:
 , a Brandenburgian (Old Märkisch) noble family, an Uradel der Uckermark, later Silesia, Ostpreußen, Pommerania, Royal Saxony, and Mecklenburg.
 Georg Holtzendorff, 19th-century German painter
 Henning von Holtzendorff (18531919), a German admiral
 Joachim Wilhelm Franz Philipp von Holtzendorff (18291889), a German jurist

German-language surnames